Burnettweldia is a genus of oak gall wasps in the Nearctic.

Species 
Burnettweldia includes five species: 

 Burnettweldia californicordazi Cuesta-Porta, Melika & Pujade-Villar
 Burnettweldia conalis Weld
 Burnettweldia corallina Bassett - coral gall wasp
 Burnettweldia plumbella Kinsey - beaked twig gall wasp
 Burnettweldia washingtonensis Gillette - round-gall wasp

References

External links 
 Burnettweldia on gallformers

Cynipidae
Hymenoptera genera